Zagrad is a village in the municipality of Benkovac, Zadar County, Croatia.

Demographics
According to the 2011 census, the village of Zagrad has 85 inhabitants. This represents 19.95% of its pre-war population according to the 1991 census.

The 1991 census recorded that 61.03% of the village population were ethnic Serbs (260/426), 38.03 % were Croats (162/426) while 0.94% were of other ethnic origin (4/426).

NOTE: The 1857, 1869, 1921 and 1931 population data is contained in population data for Nadin

Notable natives and residents 
 Danijel Subašić (born 1984) - footballer and goalkeeper for AS Monaco and the Croatia national team

References

Benkovac
Populated places in Zadar County
Serb communities in Croatia